The Franklin Township Public Schools is a comprehensive community public school district that serves students in pre-kindergarten through twelfth grade from Franklin Township, in Somerset County, New Jersey, United States.

As of the 2018–19 school year, the district, comprising 10 schools, had an enrollment of 7,150 students and 703.5 classroom teachers (on an FTE basis), for a student–teacher ratio of 10.2:1.

The district is classified by the New Jersey Department of Education as being in District Factor Group "GH", the third-highest of eight groupings. District Factor Groups organize districts statewide to allow comparison by common socioeconomic characteristics of the local districts. From lowest socioeconomic status to highest, the categories are A, B, CD, DE, FG, GH, I and J.

Awards and recognition
For the 1993-94 school year, Hillcrest Elementary School was named as a "Star School" by the New Jersey Department of Education, the highest honor that a New Jersey school can achieve. The school was honored again in the 1995-96 school year.

NAMM named the district in its 2009 survey of the "Best Communities for Music Education", which included 124 school districts nationwide.

Schools
Schools in the district (with 2018–19 enrollment data from the National Center for Education Statistics) are:
Elementary schools
Claremont Elementary School (665 students; in grades PreK-5) - school opened for 2018-19 school year
Nicole Sury-Bevere, Principal
Conerly Road School (400; PreK-5)
Donna S. Burnett, Principal
Elizabeth Avenue School (493; PreK-5)
John Haney, Principal
Franklin Park School (664; PreK-5)
Rebekah Solomon, Principal
Hillcrest School (436; PreK-5)
Albert Fico, Principal
MacAfee Road School (381; PreK-5)
Karen Adams, Principal
Pine Grove Manor School (331; PreK-5)
Miguel Rivera, Principal
Middle schools
Franklin Middle School at Hamilton Street Campus (706; 6-8)
Nicholas Solomon, Principal
Franklin Middle School at Sampson G. Smith Campus (797; 6-8)
Evelyn Rutledge, Principal
High school
Franklin High School (2,146; 9-12)
Nicholas Solomon, Principal

Former and converted schools
The "One Less Move" referendum
On December 9, 2014, a referendum was held in Franklin and was passed by voters (1,971 in favor and 1,477 against) to fix the overcrowding issues in all the district's schools (except for the High School) and for facility upgrades and additions so that they could eliminate the use of modular classrooms (trailers). It was projected that over 700 new students would come to the district as a result of new housing developments being built around town. On top of that, the grade level structure would be reconfigured so that students in the district would only have to move between schools twice instead of three times (in other words attending three schools instead of four), hence the name "One Less Move". All of Franklin's elementary schools had previously housed students in grades PreK-4, but since the reconfiguration they each now have 5th grade. 

To fix the overcrowding issues at the district's six elementary schools, Claremont Elementary School, a seventh elementary school, was built and opened in time for the 2018-19 school year, and Elizabeth Ave, and Hillcrest Elementary Schools were expanded with new classroom wings. Also in terms of facility additions, an additional gym and a new main office were built at Franklin Middle School at Sampson G. Smith as part of the referendum.

In those schools and all the others (excluding the High School), upgrades were made to replace aging and old bathrooms, windows, doors, parking lot repavement, new playgrounds and outside playing fields, exterior lighting, and electrical systems, just to name a few.

Before the 2018-19 school year, the configuration of the schools was as follows:
Franklin Middle School at Sampson G. Smith was originally Sampson G. Smith Intermediate School, for students in grades 5-6.
Franklin Middle School at Hamilton Street was originally just Franklin Middle School, for students in grades 7-8.

Administration
Core members of the district's administration are:
John A. Ravally, Superintendent
Jonathan Toth, Business Administrator / Board Secretary

Board of education
The district's board of education, comprised of nine members, sets policy and oversees the fiscal and educational operation of the district through its administration. As a Type II school district, the board's trustees are elected directly by voters to serve three-year terms of office on a staggered basis, with three seats up for election each year held (since 2012) as part of the November general election. The board appoints a superintendent to oversee the district's day-to-day operations and a business administrator to supervise the business functions of the district.

References

External links
Franklin Township Public Schools
 
School Data for the Franklin Township Public Schools, National Center for Education Statistics

Franklin Township, Somerset County, New Jersey
New Jersey District Factor Group GH
School districts in Somerset County, New Jersey